Masaji Kusakabe (born 7 August 1946) is a Japanese professional golfer.

Kusakabe played on the Japan Golf Tour, winning eight official tournaments and several others.

Professional wins (20)

Japan Golf Tour wins (8)

*Note: Tournament shortened to 27/54/63 holes due to weather.

Japan Golf Tour playoff record (0–1)

Other wins (9)
1968 Mizuno Pro Rookies Tournament
1971 Chiba Open
1973 Chiba Open
1976 Mizuno Tournament
1977 Mizuno Tournament, Gunma Open
1980 Chiba Open
1983 Munising Classic
1994 Ibaraki Open

Senior wins (3)
1996 Komatsu Nagoya TV Open
1997 Japan Ginseng Pharmaceutical West Japan Senior Open
1999 Old Man Per Senior Open

External links

Masaji Kusakabe at the PGA of Japan official website (in Japanese)

Japanese male golfers
Japan Golf Tour golfers
Sportspeople from Chiba Prefecture
1946 births
Living people
20th-century Japanese people